Pajo may refer to:

 Pajo, a surname
 Ave Pajo (born 1984), Estonian football player
 David Pajo (born 1968), American musician
 Louise Pajo (1940–2020), British actress
 Ludmilla Pajo (1947–1995), Moscow-born Albanian writer and journalist
 Pajo (given name), a South Slavic masculine name
 Pajo (mountain), a mountain in Peru
 Pajo, Bhutan, a town in Punakha District
 Pajø, a Shilluk people village in Sudan